

CD information
Format: Compact Disc (05464516882)
Stereo: Stereo
Pieces in Set: 1
Catalog #: 1688
Desc: Performer

Track listing
 Give Praises
 Come Down Father
 World Is Troubled, The
 Stay Away
 Just Talk To God
 Satisfy Yourself
 Love Will Make It - (featuring Morgan Heritage)
 Echoes Of My Mind
 Free Up The Weed
 Alpha & Omega
 Serious Times Serious Measures
 Nowhere To Go To
 We Need A Miracle
 This Feeling
 Jah Is My Keeper
 Ras She Want, The
 Only Love

2004 albums
Luciano (singer) albums